Pentylone (β-Keto-Methylbenzodioxolylpentanamine, βk-Methyl-K, βk-MBDP, methylenedioxypentedrone, or 1‐(3,4‐methylenedioxyphenyl)‐2‐(methylamino)pentan‐1‐one) is a stimulant developed in the 1960s. It is a substituted cathinone (a type of substituted phenethylamine). It has been identified in some samples of powders sold as "NRG-1", along with varying blends of other cathinone derivatives including flephedrone, MDPBP, MDPV and 4-MePPP. 
It was also found in combination with 4-MePPP being sold as "NRG-3". Reports indicate side effects include feelings of paranoia, agitation and inability to sleep, with effects lasting for several days at high doses.

Pharmacology

Pentylone acts as a serotonin-norepinephrine-dopamine reuptake inhibitor and a serotonin releasing agent.

Legality
Pentylone is banned in Canada, Germany, Sweden, the United States and in the UK.

See also 
 α-PVP
 Dipentylone
 Methylenedioxypyrovalerone (MDPV)
 Methyl-K
 N-Ethylpentylone
 Pentedrone

References 

Cathinones
Benzodioxoles
Designer drugs
Serotonin–norepinephrine–dopamine reuptake inhibitors
Serotonin releasing agents
Stimulants